Maraniss is a surname. Notable people with the surname include:

Andrew Maraniss, American sportswriter
David Maraniss (born 1949), American journalist and author

Americanized surnames